KOVO (960 AM) is a radio station broadcasting a sports format. Licensed to Provo, Utah, United States, the station serves the Provo area.  The station is currently owned by Dell Loy Hansen, through licensee Broadway Media LS, LLC. It is an affiliate for ESPN Radio, which is also the affiliate of sister station KALL.

History
The station went on the air as KOVO in 1939. In April 1948 it increased its power from 250 W to 1 KW.

Radio pioneer Arch L. Madsen, who would later achieve worldwide stature as Bonneville International Corporation's visionary leader, was KOVO's first station manager. Madsen, who previously built KSUB in Cedar City, Utah, also helped form the Inter-mountain Network which joined KOVO with KALL, KLO, and KOAL.

In much of the 1960s and part of the 1970s, the station was co-owned and managed by prominent Provo citizen, Glen Shaw. The music format was Top 40 rock. Disk Jockeys included David White, Mike VanDorn, Dwayne Case, Leonard Banks, program director Randy Morrison, and others. In the fall of 1968 the youngest DJ at the station, 19 year old Rick Dewey, came on board from stations in Alabama, to attend college in Provo. With his encouragement the station purchased the industry's top jingles package, produced by PAM Jingles in Dallas, giving the station a much-needed upgrade in sound. Along with the talented DJs that the station was procuring in the late 1960s, the station's quality was finally enhanced to the same or higher talent level as the two top rockers in Utah at the time – KNAK and KCPX in Salt Lake City, but its market share was predominantly Utah County and several counties south. Its nighttime signal occasionally reached all the way to Los Angeles, where a segment of its listeners included fellow DJs at the top rocker KHJ, as well as XERB, the “Boss Soul Power” border blaster station in Rosarito Beach, Mexico, who described themselves as fans of the station. With the advent of FM radio's rise, and with Shaw's impending retirement, in the mid-1970s the radio market changed so drastically that the station went into receivership and management changed, but the format remained the same for several years. John VanDorn took over in the mid-1970s as program director.

In 1989 Steven Grow and his brother David purchased the old KOVO radio station with hopes of real estate development. They were anxious to develop the property for the next 6–7 years and to discontinue the use of the property by a radio station. Anticipating the sale of the property, they began to arrange with the management of KOVO to remove its towers. When the property did not sell, the radio station continued to lease the property. When flooding occurred in 1983 and a dike was built, the city was careful to include all  of the property in the area protected by the dike, which seemed to indicate the intent to use the property for something other than farming and grazing. 

In subsequent years, housing was built to the north of the station, but the property never sold. The Marriott family through First Media Corporation owned this and a number of other major market stations during the 1980s. The FM call letters were KAYK when First Media acquired the stations in Provo.  First Media divested all their radio properties in the late 1980s to Cook Inlet Region Corporation of Alaska. On 1986-05-12 the station changed its call sign to KFMY which was maintained itself as "Family Radio" (There was no station promotion using this phrase during this time. Station staff always wondered what KFMY meant.) for the next six years.  The FM station was known as K-96 and was a CHR format. The 960 AM station was known as KDOT and played an adult standards format. The FM later became KZOL a satellite automated oldies station as Cook Inlet shopped the station for sale.  The FM station still owned by the Cook Inlet (not the Grow Brothers) as well as the 960 AM station, were sold to James Facer a former KJQ account executive, and promoter Jim McNeil. The station briefly simulcasted KXRK (X-96) then at 96.1 FM, then briefly "S.U.N. Student Underground Network", a format aimed at Utah Valley's college students.  The station later changed frequencies to 96.3 and moved to Farnsworth Peak near Salt Lake City. 

Facer and McNeil sold both stations to Simmons Media in the mid-1990s for approximately $9 Million. While with Simmons media KOVO would simulcast KZNS from Salt Lake City, outside of Cougar Sports 960, BYU Baseball, and Utah Valley men's basketball.

KOVO and KBLQ (KBLQ never broadcast BYU Sports) acquired the rights for BYU Cougars baseball in 2009 and air the conference BYU Baseball games, as well as select other games.

On October 24, 2014, the sale of KOVO by Simmons Media to Dell Loy Hansen's Broadway Media LS, LLC was consummated at a price of $200,000. At that time BYU baseball games would cease on KBLQ and moved solely to KOVO. The station also moved their affiliation from NBC Sports Radio to ESPN Radio.

On May 21, 2015, KOVO expanded their sports content by acquiring BYU Cougars women's soccer games produced by IMG.

KOVO's headquarters are located at 50 West Broadway Suite #200 in Salt Lake City, UT.

Programming
KOVO airs ESPN Radio 24/7 with a few exceptions. Cougar Sports with Ben Criddle every weekday during the afternoon drive.  Criddle has rotating co-hosts consisting of former BYU athletes and BYU insiders join him and Hunter Miller daily to discuss the latest news surrounding Cougar Sports. BYU Women's Soccer (Aug–Nov), Utah Valley men's basketball (Nov–Mar), and BYU Baseball (Feb–May) air regularly on the station and preempt ESPN Radio regular program during select days.

References

External links
FCC History Cards for KOVO

Mass media in Salt Lake City
OVO
Radio stations established in 1939
Sports radio stations in the United States
Provo, Utah
1939 establishments in Utah